Conchita Martínez was the defending champion but did not compete that year.

Lindsay Davenport won in the final 6–2, 6–3 against Anke Huber.

Seeds
A champion seed is indicated in bold text while text in italics indicates the round in which that seed was eliminated. The top eight seeds received a bye to the second round.

  Steffi Graf (semifinals)
  Anke Huber (final)
  Kimiko Date (quarterfinals)
  Lindsay Davenport (champion)
  Amanda Coetzer (quarterfinals)
  Irina Spîrlea (quarterfinals)
  Karina Habšudová (semifinals)
  Amy Frazier (quarterfinals)
  Ai Sugiyama (third round)
  Nathalie Tauziat (second round)
  Natasha Zvereva (third round)
  Elena Likhovtseva (first round)
  Linda Wild (second round)
  Yayuk Basuki (first round)
  Katarína Studeníková (first round)
  Barbara Schett (first round)

Draw

Finals

Top half

Section 1

Section 2

Bottom half

Section 3

Section 4

References
 1996 Acura Classic Draw

LA Women's Tennis Championships
1996 WTA Tour